The calcineurin-like phosphoesterases are a family of enzymes related to calcineurin. It includes a diverse range of phosphoesterases, including protein phosphoserine phosphatases, nucleotidases, sphingomyelin phosphodiesterases and 2'-3' cAMP phosphodiesterases as well as some bacterial nucleases. The most conserved region is a centre on the metal chelating residues.

References

Protein domains